Blennidus thoracatus is a species of ground beetle in the subfamily Pterostichinae. It was described by Moret in 2005.

References

Blennidus
Beetles described in 2005